This is a list of the main sporting local derbies and other sports rivalries in the UK.

England

American football
Bristol–South Wales rivalry: Bristol Aztecs vs. South Wales Warriors
Cheshire derby: any match between Chester Romans, Crewe Railroaders and Halton Spartans
East Anglian derby: Ipswich Cardinals vs. Norwich Devils
Essex Derby: Essex Spartans vs. East Essex Sabres.
Farnham–Kent rivalry: Farnham Knights vs. Kent Exiles
Humber–Lincolnshire rivalry: Humber Warhawks vs. Lincolnshire Bombers.
Kent–London rivalry: Kent Exiles vs. London Olympians.
Knottingley–Leeds rivalry: Knottingley Raiders vs. Leeds Bobcats
Leeds derby: Leeds Bobcats vs. Yorkshire Rams.
Leicester–Nottingham rivalry: Leicester Falcons vs. Nottingham Caesars
London derby: London Blitz vs. London Warriors, can also refer to games for either against the London Olympians.
Manchester–Merseyside rivalry: Manchester Titans vs. Merseyside Nighthawks
North East derby: Gateshead Senators vs. Northumberland Vikings
South Coast derby: Portsmouth Dreadnoughts vs Solent Thrashers
Swindon–Oxford rivalry: Swindon Storm vs. Oxford Saints
West Midlands derby: any match between Birmingham Bulls, Sandwell Steelers and Tamworth Phoenix
Yorkshire derby: any match between Doncaster Mustangs, Sheffield Giants and Yorkshire Rams

Association football

Basketball
Leicester Riders vs. Newcastle Eagles
Glasgow Rocks vs. Newcastle Eagles
North-East derby: Durham Wildcats vs. Newcastle Eagles
Yorkshire Derby: Leeds Force vs Sheffield Sharks

Cricket
London derby: Middlesex CCC vs. Surrey CCC
War of the Roses: Lancashire CCC vs. Yorkshire CCC
 West Midlands derby: Warwickshire CCC vs. Worcestershire CCC
 Battle of the Bridge: Essex CCC vs. Kent CCC
 South Coast: Hampshire CCC vs. Sussex CCC

Ice hockey
Basingstoke Bison vs. Guildford Flames
Bracknell Bees vs. Slough Jets
Milton Keynes Lightning vs. Peterborough Phantoms
Nottingham Panthers vs. Sheffield Steelers
Tyne-Tees derby: Billingham Stars vs. Whitley Bay Warriors
Essex derby: London Raiders vs. Chelmsford Chieftains

Korfball
Big Two derby: Bec KC vs. Trojans KC
Manchester derby: Manchester Hawks vs. Manchester Warriors
Milton Keynes derby: MK Bucks vs. MK Lakers

Motorcycle Speedway
Somerset derby: Swindon Robins vs. Somerset Rebels

Rowing 
The Boat Race : Oxford University Boat Club Vs Cambridge University Boat Club

Rugby league

The Battle of the Borough Derby: Leigh Centurions vs Wigan Warriors
The Calder Derby: Castleford Tigers vs Wakefield Trinity
The Cheshire Derby: Widnes Vikings vs. Warrington Wolves
The Cumbrian Derby: Whitehaven vs. Workington Town
The East Lancashire Derby: Oldham Roughyeds vs. Rochdale Hornets
The Five Towns Derby: Castleford Tigers vs. Featherstone Rovers
The Good Friday Derby: St. Helens v Wigan Warriors
The Heavy Woollen Derby: Batley Bulldogs vs. Dewsbury Rams
The Hull Derby: Hull F.C. vs. Hull Kingston Rovers
The Leeds Derby: Leeds Rhinos vs. Hunslet
The London Derby: London Broncos vs. London Skolars
The Locker Cup Derby: Warrington Wolves vs. Wigan Warriors
The Roses Derby: Oldham Roughyeds or Rochdale Hornets vs. Huddersfield Giants or Halifax
The Salford Derby: Salford Red Devils vs. Swinton Lions
The South Yorkshire Derby: Sheffield Eagles vs. Doncaster
The War of the Roses Derby: Leeds Rhinos vs. Wigan Warriors
The West Yorkshire Derby: Bradford Bulls vs. Leeds Rhinos (The term is also used to describe a four way rivalry with the addition of Huddersfield Giants and Halifax)

Rugby union

 The London Derby: Harlequin F.C. vs. Saracens F.C.
 The East Midlands Derby: Leicester Tigers vs. Northampton Saints
 Bath-Bristol derby: Bristol Rugby vs. Bath Rugby
 West Country derby: Gloucester Rugby vs. Bath Rugby
 The New West Country derby: Bristol Rugby vs. Exeter Chiefs
 Milton Keynes derby: Bletchley RUFC vs. Milton Keynes RUFC vs. Olney RFC
 Former West London/Hampstead FC Split Derby: Wasps RFC vs. Harlequin F.C.
 M69 Derby: Wasps RFC vs. Leicester Tigers
 Former Thames Valley Derby: Wasps RFC vs. London Irish RFC
 Exiles Derby: London Irish RFC vs. London Welsh RFC vs. London Scottish RFC
 South Hampshire derby: Havant RFC vs. Gosport and Fareham R.F.C.
 Hertfordshire derby: Old Haberdashers RFC vs. Tabard RFC
 Luton-Dunstable derbies: Luton RFC vs. Dunstablians RFC vs. Stockwood Park RFC
North Devon derby: Barnstaple RFC vs. Bideford RFC
Beds derby/ The Battle for Bedfordshire: Bedford Blues vs. Ampthill RUFC
RAG derby: London Scottish v Richmond

Northern Ireland

Association football

Gaelic football
 Armagh–Tyrone rivalry: Armagh v Tyrone
 Sperrin derby: Derry v Tyrone
 Armagh-Down rivalry: Armagh v Down

Scotland

American football
East Kilbride–Edinburgh rivalry: East Kilbride Pirates vs. Edinburgh Wolves
Glasgow derby: East Kilbride Pirates vs. Glasgow Tigers

Association football

Basketball
Edinburgh derby: Boroughmuir Blaze vs. City of Edinburgh Kings

Cricket
Edinburgh Derby: Carlton Cricket Club vs. Grange Cricket Club

Ice Hockey
Scottish derby: 
Fife Flyers vs. Braehead Clan
Braehead Clan vs. Edinburgh Capitals
Braehead Clan vs. Dundee Stars
Dundee-Kirkcaldy derby: Fife Flyers vs. Dundee Stars
Forth derby: Fife Flyers vs. Edinburgh Capitals

Motorcycle Speedway
Scottish Speedway Derby: Edinburgh Monarchs vs. Glasgow Tigers

Rowing 
Scottish Boat Race: Edinburgh University Boat Club vs. Glasgow University Boat Club

Rugby union
1872 Cup: Edinburgh vs. Glasgow Warriors

Shinty
 Badenoch derby: Kingussie Camanachd vs. Newtonmore Camanachd Club

Wales

Association football

Anglesey derby: Llanfairpwll vs. Llangefni Town
Gwynedd derby: Bangor City, Caernarfon Town or Porthmadog
A40 Derby: Haverfordwest County vs. Carmarthen Town
Flintshire derby: Connah's Quay Nomads vs. Flint Town United

Defunct
North Wales derby: Rhyl F.C. vs. Bangor City

Rugby league

Welsh Derby: North Wales Crusaders vs. West Wales Raiders

Rugby union

Judgement Day rivalries consist of any match between Ospreys, Dragons, Scarlets, and Cardiff Blues. Specific rivalries with these four include:
West Wales Derby: Ospreys vs. Scarlets
South Wales Derby: Ospreys vs. Cardiff Blues
East Wales Derby: Cardiff Blues vs. Dragons

References

Sports rivalries in the United Kingdom